LGBT-related films released in the 1970s are listed in the following articles:
 List of LGBT-related films of 1970
 List of LGBT-related films of 1971
 List of LGBT-related films of 1972
 List of LGBT-related films of 1973
 List of LGBT-related films of 1974
 List of LGBT-related films of 1975
 List of LGBT-related films of 1976
 List of LGBT-related films of 1977
 List of LGBT-related films of 1978
 List of LGBT-related films of 1979

 
1970s